Edgar Fosburgh Kaiser Sr. (July 29, 1908 – December 7, 1981) was an American industrialist, who was Chairman of Kaiser Aluminum and Chemical Corporation, the Kaiser Cement Corporation and the Kaiser Steel Corporation.

Edgar was born in Seattle and spent his youth growing on construction camps of his father Henry J. Kaiser. He gained experience fulfilling junior roles in the associated construction sites, but opted to study economics when he attended the University of California. In 1930 he left in his final year without graduating, but with his father's approval. He went to work on pipeline construction. Then in 1932 he moved on work on the Boulder Dam. Here he started as a shovel foreman before being promoted to superintendent of canyon excavation. He then moved on to working on the Bonneville Dam.

In 1941 Edgar was appointed Vice-President and General Manager of Kaiser Shipyards responsible for building ships from prefabricated parts in the context of the Second World War as part of the Emergency Shipbuilding program. In 1947, he was appointed General Manager of  the Kaiser-Frazer Corporation which was where his father's corporation produced cars.

Kaiser received the Award of Excellence from Engineering News-Record for his service under President Lyndon Johnson on the Committee on Urban Housing. His work on this committee to increase the availability of housing for low- and moderate-income families earned him the Medal of Freedom.

References

1908 births
1981 deaths
Henry J. Kaiser
Kaiser Aluminum